Lera may refer to:

Given name
 Lera Auerbach (born 1973), Russian classical pianist
 Lera Boroditsky (born 1976), Belarusian scientist
 Lera Kudryavtseva (born 1971), Russian television presenter
 Lera Loeb, Ukrainian writer
 Lera Lynn (born 1984), American singer-songwriter
 Lera Millard Thomas (1900-1993), American politician

Surname
 Antonio F. Lera (born 1952), Spanish writer
 Joe Lera (born 1961), Papua New Guinean politician
 Marie Léra (1864-1958), French journalist, novelist, translator
 Thomas Lera, American philatelist

Places

 Lera, Bitola, a village in North Macedonia
 Monte Lera, a mountain in Italy
 Lera, a village in Chiojdu Commune, Buzău County, Romania